Polygonia c-aureum, the Asian comma, is a middle-size butterfly found in Japan (from Hokkaidō to Tanegashima), Korean Peninsula, China, Taiwan, and Indochina.

Appearance
It has a wingspan of 27 mm. Wings are orange with black dots. The undersides of the wings is mottled brown (tree bark like) with a shiny comma mark on the center of the hindwing. The main difference with other comma species is that it has blueish markings on the bottom of its hindwing.

Ecology
P. c-aureum is common in suburban areas. It is not a threatened species. The larvae of the species feed on plants such as: Humulus japonicus, the Japanese hop.

References

Kazuo Unno et al., Hana-to chou-wo tanoshimu batafurai gāden nyūmon, Nou-san-gyo-son bunka kyoukai, 15 June 1999, 

Nymphalini
Butterflies described in 1758
Taxa named by Carl Linnaeus